Ballinode (foaled 1916) was an Irish racehorse who won the 1925 Cheltenham Gold Cup. She was the first mare and the first Irish-trained horse to win the race. She was known as "The Sligo Mare."

Background
Ballinode was a chestnut mare bred in Ireland. She was one of the few horses of any consequence sired by Machakos, a son of the Coventry Stakes winner Desmond. Ballinode's dam, Celia, was a half-sister to the Ascot Gold Cup winner Love Wisely. During her racing career she was owned by Christopher Bentley and trained in Ireland by Frank Morgan. The mare was named after a village in County Sligo where Bentley lived.

Racing career
In her early racing career Ballinode won several races in Ireland, acquiring a reputation for being fast but making occasional jumping errors. In March 1924 she was sent to the Cheltenham Festival for the first time and finished second in the National Hunt Handicap Chase A month later she finished eighth in the Grand National. In the following season she returned to Britain for the autumn meeting at Aintree Racecourse and won the Grand Sefton Steeplechase, beating Ardeen into second place. She won again at Nottingham Racecourse in February 1925. On 11 March 1925 she was one of four horses to contest the second running of the Cheltenham Gold Cup and started the 3/1 second favourite. The other three runners were the odds-on favourite Alcazar, the 1924 runner-up Conjuror and the National Hunt Chase winner Patsey V. Ridden by Ted Leader the Irish mare settled in second place behind Alcazar and the pair soon drew well clear of the other two runners. Ballinode took the lead at the second last and won very easily by five lengths. Eighteen days later the mare started 10/1 second favourite for the Grand National but failed to complete the course.

Assessment and honours
In their book, A Century of Champions, based on the Timeform rating system, John Randall and Tony Morris rated Ballinode a "poor" Gold Cup winner. She is remembered in the name of Ballinode Close, a residential street in Cheltenham.

Pedigree

References 

1916 racehorse births
Racehorses bred in Ireland
Racehorses trained in Ireland
Thoroughbred family 11-e
Cheltenham Gold Cup winners
Cheltenham Festival winners
National Hunt racehorses